André Bouvier was a French boxer. He competed in the men's lightweight event at the 1908 London Summer Olympics. At the 1908 Summer Olympics, he lost to Harold Holmes of Great Britain.

References

External links
 

Year of birth missing
Year of death missing
French male boxers
Olympic boxers of France
Boxers at the 1908 Summer Olympics
Place of birth missing
Lightweight boxers